Crack Money is a South African business devoted to the sale, post-World Cup, of South African paraphernalia used during the World Cup in South Africa.  The bulk of the articles are donated from former World Cup players, and 10% of the profits go towards exposing the extortion and manipulation that goes into FIFA player contracts controlled by player agents on the easily impressionable players in Africa and South America.

References 

 The African Youth Soccer Player - Exploited and Abused - Harmon Publishing

Soccer in South Africa
2010 FIFA World Cup
Association football controversies